The Thomas Swadkins House is a historic house in Arlington, Massachusetts.  This -story wood frame was built c. 1882, and features both Gothic and Italianate styling.  The gable decorations and porch railing are Gothic, while the house massing and brackets are Italianate, as are the window surrounds and the round-arch window on the right side.  It was one of the first houses built when the Crescent Hill area was developed in the 1880s.

The house was listed on the National Register of Historic Places in 1985.  It was renovated and expanded in 2009.

See also
National Register of Historic Places listings in Arlington, Massachusetts

References

Houses on the National Register of Historic Places in Arlington, Massachusetts
Houses in Arlington, Massachusetts